Haralds Kārlis (born 29 April 1991) is a Latvian professional basketball player who plays for BK Jūrmala of the Latvian League.

Professional career
After graduating from college, Kārlis signed his first professional contract with Latvian team BK Valmiera where he played 2 seasons. In 2015-16 season BK Valmiera got gold medals in Latvian basketball league by beating VEF Riga in the final. 2016-17 .

On 3 October 2017, signed with BK Jūrmala. for 2017-18 season. Haralds was named most valuable player in February.

International career
Haralds Kārlis was selected in Latvian national basketball team roster for the 2015 EuroBasket.

References

External links
 at basketnews.lt
 at eurobasket.com

1991 births
Living people
Latvian men's basketball players
Latvian expatriate basketball people in the United States
Seton Hall Pirates men's basketball players
Shooting guards
Small forwards
Basketball players from Riga
BK Jūrmala players
BK Valmiera players
CB Gran Canaria players
BK Barons players